Cannonball!!! is a 2012 studio album by American rapper Bleubird, released on Fake Four Inc. Production is handled by Astronautalis and Radical Face. "Time 4real" features a guest appearance from Ceschi.

Critical reception
Thomas Quinlan of Exclaim! said, "While not your typical hip-hop album, fans open to experimentation with different genres will find Cannonball!!! a rewarding, if eclectic, half-hour-plus of music." Brett Uddenberg of URB called it Bleubird's "most focused and well-rounded" work to date.

Track listing

References

External links
 
 

2012 albums
Bleubird albums
Fake Four Inc. albums